Phrontis vibex, common name the bruised nassa, is a species of sea snail, a marine gastropod mollusk in the family Nassariidae, the Nassa mud snails or dog whelks.

Description
The length of the shell varies from 10 mm to 20 mm. The shell is ovate and conical. The spire is composed of six or seven indistinct whorls, subconvex, plaited throughout their whole length, crossed by fine and very close transverse striae. Those of the base are more prominent.  The longitudinal folds disappear insensibly upon the right side of the body whorl, at the upper part of which we find merely nodosities. The whitish aperture is rounded. The cavity has a brown color, and is marked by transverse bands. The outer lip is bordered externally, and ornamented internally, with small, fine striae. The columella is arcuated and is covered with a fairly wide callosity, brown at its upper part, and white towards the base, which is adorned with small guttules. The coloring of the shell is olive, with a white or yellowish band. Upon the top of the body whorl, the folds and the tubercles are sometimes whitish.

Distribution
The distribution of Nassarius vibex is from 41.6°N to 27°S; 97.38°W to 34.9°W, the northwest Atlantic, Gulf of Mexico, Caribbean Sea, and southwest Atlantic.

This marine species occurs off the following countries:
 USA: Massachusetts, New York, New Jersey, Virginia, North Carolina, South Carolina, Georgia, Florida: East Florida, West Florida; Louisiana, Texas
 Mexico: Tabasco, Veracruz, Campeche State, Yucatán State, Quintana Roo
 Nicaragua
 Lesser Antilles
 Costa Rica
 Cuba
 Panama
 Colombia
 Venezuela: Gulf of Venezuela
 Jamaica
 Virgin Islands: St. Croix
 Brazil: Para, Maranhao, Ceara, Rio Grande do Norte, Pernambuco, Alagoas, Bahia, Rio de Janeiro, São Paulo, Parana and Santa Catarina.

References
This article incorprotates CC-BY-SA-3.0 text from the reference

 Cernohorsky W. O. (1984). Systematics of the family Nassariidae (Mollusca: Gastropoda). Bulletin of the Auckland Institute and Museum 14: 1–356. 
 Rosenberg, G., F. Moretzsohn, and E. F. García. 2009. Gastropoda (Mollusca) of the Gulf of Mexico, Pp. 579–699 in Felder, D.L. and D.K. Camp (eds.), Gulf of Mexico–Origins, Waters, and Biota. Biodiversity. Texas A&M Press, College Station, Texas.

External links
 Yokoyama L. Q. & Amaral A. C. Z. (2011). "Temporal variation in egg-capsule deposition by Nassarius vibex (Gastropoda: Nassariidae) Invertebrate Reproduction & Development". Invertebrate Reproduction and Development 55(2): 82–90. .
 Pollock, L.W. (1998). A practical guide to the marine animals of northeastern North America. Rutgers University Press. New Brunswick, New Jersey & London. 367 pp
 

Nassariidae
Gastropods described in 1822